
Year 222 BC was a year of the pre-Julian Roman calendar. At the time it was known as the Year of the Consulship of Marcellus and Calvus (or, less frequently, year 532 Ab urbe condita). The denomination 222 BC for this year has been used since the early medieval period, when the Anno Domini calendar era became the prevalent method in Europe for naming years.

Events 
 By place 

 Roman Republic 
 Mediolanum (modern Milan), stronghold of the Gallic tribe of the Insubres (led by Viridomarus), falls to Roman legions in Lombardy (led by consul, Marcus Claudius Marcellus), in the Battle of Clastidium. Marcus Claudius Marcellus personally slays the chief, Viridomarus. This victory removes the Gallic threat to Rome. Marcellus wins the spolia opima ("spoils of honour": the arms taken by a general who kills an enemy chief in single combat) for the third and last time in Roman history.

 Greece 
 Cleomenes III of Sparta is defeated in the Battle of Sellasia (north of Sparta) by Antigonus III and his allies, the Achaean League and the Illyrians (under the command of Demetrius of Pharos), and flees to Egypt under the protection of King Ptolemy III. Antigonus III's forces occupy Sparta, which is the first time this city has ever been occupied.
 Almost all of Greece falls under Macedonian suzerainty after Antigonus III re-establishes the Hellenic Alliance as a confederacy of leagues, with himself as president.

 Seleucid Empire 
 The Seleucid forces under their general Achaeus succeed in winning back, from Pergamum, all the Seleucid domains in Anatolia lost six years earlier.
 Mithridates II of Pontus gives his daughter Laodice in marriage to the Seleucid king Antiochus III. Another of his daughters, also named Laodice, is married about the same time to Achaeus, a cousin of Antiochus.

 China 
 The Qin general Wang Jian conquers Wuyue, forcing the capitulation of its ruler. The conquered region becomes the province of Kuaiji. This campaign completes the subjugation of the lands formerly held by the State of Chu, and it also serves as a precursor for the Qin campaign against the Yue tribes.
 The Qin generals Wang Ben and Li Xin conquer Liaodong, thereby completing the subjugation of Yan.
 Wang Ben conquers Dai, thereby completing the subjugation of Zhao.

Deaths 
 Ctesibius, Greek inventor and mathematician
 Eucleidas, king of Sparta (killed in the Battle of Sellasia)
 Ptolemy III Euergetes (the Benefactor), king of Egypt
 Viridomarus, military leader of the Insubres (Gaul)
 Xi of Yan, king of the Yan State (Warring States Period)

References